We Like to Party may refer to:
"We Like to Party" (Showtek song)
"We Like to Party" (Vengaboys song)
"We Like to Party" (Party Animals song)
"We Like to Party", a song by Inna from the album Party Never Ends
"We Like 2 Party", a song by Big Bang